Pedioplanis is a genus of lizards in the family Lacertidae. All species of Pedioplanis are endemic to southern Africa.

Species
There are 16 valid species in this genus:

Pedioplanis benguelensis (Bocage, 1867) – Angolan sand lizard, Bocage's sand lizard
Pedioplanis branchi Childers, Kirchhof, & Bauer, 2021
Pedioplanis breviceps (Sternfeld, 1911) – short-headed sand lizard, short-headed sandveld lizard, Sternfeld's sand lizard
Pedioplanis burchelli (A.M.C. Duméril & Bibron, 1839) – Burchell's sand lizard
Pedioplanis gaerdesi (Mertens, 1954) – Kaokoland sand lizard, Mayer's sand lizard
Pedioplanis haackei Conradie, Measey, Branch & Tolley, 2012
Pedioplanis huntleyi Conradie, Measey, Branch & Tolley, 2012
Pedioplanis husabensis Berger-Dell'Mour & Mayer, 1989 – Husab sand lizard
Pedioplanis inornata (Roux, 1907) – plain sand lizard, western sand lizard
Pedioplanis laticeps (A. Smith, 1849) – Cape sand lizard, Karoo sand lizard
Pedioplanis lineoocellata (A.M.C. Duméril & Bibron, 1839) – common sand lizard, ocellated sand lizard, spotted sand lizard
Pedioplanis mayeri Childers, Kirchhof, & Bauer, 2021
Pedioplanis namaquensis (A.M.C. Duméril & Bibron, 1839) – Namaqua sand lizard
Pedioplanis rubens (Mertens, 1954) – Ruben's sand lizard, Waterberg sand lizard
Pedioplanis serodioi Parrinha, Marques, Heinicke, Khalid, Parker, Tolley, Childers, Conradie, Bauer, & Ceriaco, 2021 
Pedioplanis undata (A. Smith, 1838) - plain sand lizard, western sand lizard

Nota bene: A binomial authority in parentheses indicates that the species was originally described in a genus other than Pedioplanis.

References

Further reading
Branch, Bill (2004). Field Guide to Snakes and other Reptiles of Southern Africa. Third Revised edition, Second impression. Sanibel Island, Florida: Ralph Curtis Books. 399 pp. . (Genus Pedioplanis, p. 170). (11 species of Pedioplanis, pp. 170–174).
Fitzinger L (1843). Systema Reptilium, Fasciculus Primus, Amblyglossae. Vienna: Braumüller & Seidel. 106 pp. + indices. (Pedioplanis, new genus, p. 21). (in Latin).

 
Reptiles of Africa
Lizard genera
Taxa named by Leopold Fitzinger